Dead Man on Campus is a 1998 black comedy film starring Tom Everett Scott and Mark-Paul Gosselaar. It centers on the urban legend that a student gets straight As if their roommate commits suicide (see pass by catastrophe). Two failing friends attempt to find a depressed roommate to push him over the edge and receive As.

To boost ticket sales, the film's U.S. release was timed with the start of the new college school year in late August 1998. It was the first film by MTV Films to have an R rating. The film was shot at University of the Pacific in Stockton, California.

Plot
Josh gets into college on a scholarship, and Cooper is assigned as his roommate. Cooper does little work and instead spends all the time partying and consistently fails his courses, but his father continues to pay his tuition. The normally studious Josh is led astray by Cooper's lifestyle, and spends the first half of his first year partying instead of studying, and consequently fails all of his midterm exams.

To his horror, Josh then finds out that a condition of his scholarship is a passing mark average each year, and that with his poor midterm score, he needs an A+++ in all of his courses or he will lose his scholarship.

Meanwhile, Cooper's father finally realizes Cooper is not trying to pass his course at all, and threatens to pull his funding if he does not get a passing mark this year, leaving him in a similar position. They find out about an obscure academic rule that states that if a student's roommate commits suicide, then the roommates get perfect marks for that year, regardless of any previous academic standing. Cooper and Josh set out to find roommates who are likely to commit suicide; their first potential roommate, Cliff O'Malley, is more likely to get himself (and any one with him) killed than commit suicide. They soon realize that he will likely get them killed or arrested and jump out of his moving car when he is being chased by the police.

Next, they try Buckley Schrank, a computer geek who thinks Bill Gates wants his brain. After they move him in, they try to push him over the edge. First, Cooper poses as a suicide hotline volunteer, and when Buckley calls, he tells him he is Bill Gates and wants his brain. Then, Cooper buys equipment that may assist in a suicide (rope, daggers, prescription drugs) and as Josh and he are trying to plant them around the dorm room, Buckley discovers the pair hiding from him with a noose and knife in hand. He, thinking they are trying to kill him, and that the conspiracy is real, runs away.

Finally, Josh and Cooper move in with Matt Noonan, a moody rock musician. Later, Cooper catches him singing show tunes and learns he was voted Mr. Happy in high school, leading them to believe that he is only pretending to be depressed to impress girls and make a name for himself in music. Facing the loss of his scholarship, Josh stands on the edge of a bridge, about to commit suicide himself. Cooper tells Josh he is not a failure and talks him down. When Josh comes down from the bridge, he reveals to Cooper that he was faking his suicide attempt so the school would not fail him, and Cooper would look like a hero to his father.

The film ends with Josh narrating that he was given an additional semester to improve his grades, in which he saved his scholarship, and that Cooper became a more serious student, but did work summers cleaning toilets for his father's business to learn how to eventually take over.

Cast

Filming location
Scenes were shot on the campus of University of the Pacific (Stockton, California), Modesto's 7th Street Bridge, and outside the campus of University of Southern California.

Reception
The film grossed $15,064,946 domestically against a $14 million budget.

Dead Man on Campus received negative reviews from critics. The movie has a 15% rating on the aggregate film review site Rotten Tomatoes based on 46 reviews. The site's consensus reads, "Not much of a story." 

The New York Times said the film was "predictably dumb", but praised Mark-Paul Gosselaar's performance, saying, "Mr. Gosselaar is so good, however, that his performance as Cooper sometimes overrides the film's adolescent tone." The San Francisco Chronicles Mick LaSalle said although there were some laughs, "the overall premise, involving mental illness and suicide, isn't all that funny, at least not in practice, and the picture begins to seem labored and long. Josh and his buddy go through the last hour of Dead Man on Campus anxious and unhappy. When they stop having fun, so does the audience."

Soundtrack

See also
Academic grading in the United States

References

External links
 
 
 
 

1998 films
1990s black comedy films
1990s buddy comedy films
American black comedy films
American buddy comedy films
1990s English-language films
Films about fraternities and sororities
Films about suicide
Films based on urban legends
Films set in universities and colleges
MTV Films films
Paramount Pictures films
Films scored by Mark Mothersbaugh
Films with screenplays by Mike White
1998 comedy films
1990s teen comedy films
Films shot in California
University of the Pacific (United States)
1998 directorial debut films
1990s American films